Pawan Nayyar is an Indian politician of the Bharatiya Janata Party (BJP) and is a member of the legislative assembly (MLA) from Chamba, Himachal Pradesh.

References

Year of birth missing (living people)
Living people
Himachal Pradesh politicians
Bharatiya Janata Party politicians from Himachal Pradesh